Alina Viktorivna Lohvynenko (born 18 July 1990) is a Ukrainian athlete who competes in the sprint with a personal best time of 51.19 seconds at the 400 metres event.

Career
Lohvynenko won the gold medal at the 2012 European Athletics Championships in Helsinki at the 4×400 metres relay.

She competed in the women's 400 m at the 2012 Summer Olympics, and the 4 x 400 m relay at the 2012 and 2016 Summer Olympics.

References

 

1990 births
Living people
People from Bakhmut
Ukrainian female sprinters
Olympic athletes of Ukraine
Athletes (track and field) at the 2012 Summer Olympics
Athletes (track and field) at the 2016 Summer Olympics
European Athletics Championships medalists
Sportspeople from Donetsk Oblast
Athletes (track and field) at the 2020 Summer Olympics
Olympic female sprinters
20th-century Ukrainian women
21st-century Ukrainian women
Olympic bronze medalists for Ukraine
Medalists at the 2012 Summer Olympics
Olympic bronze medalists in athletics (track and field)